Falam Chin, or Lai (Falam Chin), is a Kuki-Chin language in Falam township, Chin State, Myanmar, and also in Mizoram, India.

Falam Chin is closely related to most Central Chin languages, especially Hakha Chin.

The Falam people are primarily Christian and have translated the Bible into Falam Chin.

Dialects
Ethnologue lists the following dialects of Falam.

Tlaisun (Shunkla, Sunkhla, Taishon, Tashom, Tashon)
Laizo (Laiso, Laizao, Laizo-Shimhrin)
Zahao (Lyen-Lyem, JaHau Yahow, Zahau, Zahau-Shimhrin, Za-How)
Sim,

Falam was a village name founded by the Tlaisun (also known as Tashon in English) tribe and Tashon was the original language spoken in Falam. Falam became increased in population from the surrounding tribes from Sunthla (also recorded as Sunkhla), Sim and Zahau (also recorded as Zahao) that created a new language based on these three tribes which are very different from Tlaisun language and this language was later popularly known as Laizo language. Laizo language was recorded as the first language used in the official radio broadcasting dialect of Chin in Myanmar (Burma). In order to be inclusive in Laizo language this language was later changed to Falam language although its official name recorded in the government is Laizo.

Rupini and Koloi are also reported to be quite different. Dialects once misleadingly called Southern Luhupa are actually Northern Kuki-Chin, and evidently Falam.

Ethnologue reports the following speaker populations of Falam dialects as of 1983: 9,000 Taisun, 16,000 Zanniat, 7,000 Khualsim, 4,000 Lente, 14,400 Zahau, 18,600 Laizo.

Written/Spoken Falam Chin

This is a sample of written Falam Chin:

Falam Chin is written in romanized form, or in the Latin, with the exception of the letters Q, Y, J and X. However, the consonant ṭ (t with dot), ng (Guttural sound), and aw vowel (IPA [] or []) are frequently used in both Chin literature and speaking.

Falam Chin Characters
Consonants
b c d f g h j k l m n p r s t ṭ v z
Vowels 
a .... as in amphibious
aw.... as in omega  (Long vowel)
e  .... as in example
i  .... as in interesting
o .... as in son (Short vowel)
u .... as in due 

The Falam language has five spoken vowels, but in writing, six are used. Of the five spoken, three of them, /u/, /a/, and /ɔ/ are spoke from the back of the mouth, /i/ is spoken from the top of the mouth, and /e/ is spoken from the middle. /ɔ/ can be pronounced as aw or o.
|

References

Further reading

Dum, James Qial; Van Kyi; S Hrang Kap Hnin (eds). 2009. Mirang—Lai (Falam) dictionary / Mirang Ca Zirpawl hrang. Lailun Foundation.
Bibles International. 2009. Falam primer. Bibles International: The Bible Society of Baptist Mid-Missions. 
Bibles International. 2008. Falam writers' handbook. Bibles International: The Bible Society of Baptist Mid-Missions. 
Bibles International. 2009. Chin Cangantui Kutkaih / Chin Writers' Handbook - Falam. Bibles International: The Bible Society of Baptist Mid-Missions. 

Kuki-Chin languages
Languages of Mizoram